Constantino León López (born April 12, 1974 in Pampas, Huancavelica) is a Peruvian marathon runner. He set a personal best time of 2:17:03, by finishing eleventh at the 2010 Chosunilbo Chunchon International Marathon in Chuncheon, South Korea.

Leon represented Peru at the 2008 Summer Olympics in Beijing, where he competed for the men's marathon. He successfully finished the race in sixty-first place by ten seconds ahead of Montenegro's Goran Stojiljković, with a time of 2:28:04.

Personal bests
10,000 m: 30:34.6 min –  Lima, 4 June 1999
Half marathon: 1:03:53 min –  Lima, 29 August 2010
Marathon: 2:17:03 hrs –  Chunchon, 24 October 2010

Achievements

References

External links

Sports reference biography
Tilastopaja biography
NBC Olympics Profile

Peruvian male marathon runners
Living people
Pan American Games competitors for Peru
Athletes (track and field) at the 2011 Pan American Games
Olympic athletes of Peru
Athletes (track and field) at the 2008 Summer Olympics
People from Huancavelica Region
1974 births